Ciucci is an Italian surname. Notable people with the surname include:

 Alfredo Ciucci (born 1920), Italian footballer
 Antonio Filippo Ciucci (died 1710), Italian physician
 Pietro Ciucci (born 1950), Italian businessman

Italian-language surnames